The Accrington Pals is a 1981 play by Peter Whelan. It is based on the Accrington Pals unit in the First World War and contrasts its life at the front and experiences in the 1916 Battle of the Somme with the women left behind in Accrington.

History

Production history
Whelan's inspiration for The Accrington Pals, he wrote, stemmed from his fascination with a "fuzzy snapshot of [his] mother taken in the First World War." It has been likened to the "documentary plays" of the 1960s.

The play was premiered at the Warehouse in London on 10 April 1981 by the Royal Shakespeare Company.

Among contemporaneous theater critics, Michael Billington noted the debut's "combination of theatricality and truth, likening it to the works of Harold Brighouse and Stanley Houghton; he would later call its 2013 revival "one of the best plays ever about the first world war. John Barber was less enthusiastic, claiming the work was Whelan "not at his happiest."

Premiere cast and crew
 Janet Dale (May)
 Nicholas Gecks (Tom)
 Peter Chelsom (Ralph)
 Trudie Styler (Eva)
 Sharon Bower (Sarah)
 Hilary Townley (Bertha)
 Brenda Fricker (Annie)
 Andrew Jarvis (Arthur)
 Jack Marcus (Reggie)
 Bob Peck (C.S.M. Rivers)
 Bill Alexander (Director)
 Kit Surrey (Design)
 Michael Calf (Lighting)
 John A. Leonard (Sound)
 Peter Washtell (Music arrangement)

Other productions
 In February 2013 James Dacre directed a revival at the Royal Exchange, Manchester with Emma Lowndes as May, Sarah Ridgeway as Eva, Robin Morrissey as Tom and Gerard Kearns as Ralph. The production won a UK Theatre Award for best design.
 In October 2017 Dumbarton People's Theatre performed the play.

Publication history
The play was first published by Methuen London Ltd in 1982.

Scenes
Act 1
 i)	May's market stall
 ii)	Recruiting office
 iii)	May's stall
 iv)	May's kitchen
 v)	May's kitchen (doubling as Tom's watch post.)
 vi)	May's kitchen
 vii)	May's stall (doubling as Caernarvon)
 viii)	May's stall
 ix)	May's kitchen
 x)	May's stall

Act 2
 i)	May's kitchen/France
 ii)	May's kitchen/France
 iii)	May's kitchen
 iv)	The Somme front, France
 v)	Sarah's backyard
 vi)	May's kitchen
 vii)	May's stall
 viii)	May's stall

References

British plays
1982 plays
Plays about World War I